Home and Away was a comic strip written and drawn by Steve Sicula. It was syndicated nationally by the Washington Post Writers Group from 2003 to 2015.

History
Sicula created Home and Away around age 40, after four or five of his other comic strips were rejected by publishers. The comic strip began in 2003 and ceased publication in August 2015.

Characters and story
The strip is about the Szwyk family. Sam, the father, is a remote worker who is also in charge of homemaking, which he does with varying degrees of success. Sandy, the mother, is a successful saleswoman who is always on the go and trying to balance her personal and professional lives. Their two children, Karen and Timmy, are just as busy as their parents and, for better or worse, have picked up their parents' habits.

References

External links
 Home and Away at GoComics

2003 comics debuts
2015 comics endings
American comic strips
Comics about married people
Comics set in the United States
Gag-a-day comics
Slice of life comics